The Mayville Public Library on Center Ave., N., Mayville, North Dakota was built in 1900.  It was designed by Fargo architect William C. Albrant.  It was listed on the National Register of Historic Places in 1977.

The library was funded by donations of J.L. Grandin and E.B. Grandin, who made money in bonanza farming.

References

Library buildings completed in 1900
Libraries on the National Register of Historic Places in North Dakota
National Register of Historic Places in Traill County, North Dakota
Public libraries in North Dakota
1900 establishments in North Dakota
Mayville, North Dakota